The California thrasher (Toxostoma redivivum) is a large member of family Mimidae found primarily in chaparral habitat in California and Baja California. It is the only species of Toxostoma throughout most of its range.

Taxonomy and systematics

The California thrasher is closely related to the crissal thrasher (Toxostoma crissale) and LeConte's thrasher (T. lecontei), and the three may form a superspecies. It has two subspecies, the nominate T. r. redivivum and T. r. sonomae.

Description

It has a distinctive long, decurved beak and a long tail. It is generally deep grayish brown above with olive tones on the tail. It has a grayish buff supercilium, a dark cheek pattern and eye line, and unlike most thrashers, has dark eyes. The underparts are mostly buffy to tawny brown, with the upper breast and flanks a smoky gray. The two subspecies differ only slightly.

Distribution and habitat

The nominate subspecies of California thrasher is found from Santa Cruz and Placer counties, California, south into northwestern Baja California, Mexico. T. r. sonomae is found from Trinity and adjoining counties in northern California southwards  to the range of the nominate subspecies. There appears to be slight overlap allowing gene flow between them. 

The California thrasher is a year round resident of both slopes of the California Coast Ranges and the western slope of the Sierra Nevada. It is only rarely found in the Central Valley between them. Its primary habitat is chaparral. It also inhabits sagebrush, juniper bushland, and riparian and oak woodlands with a dense understory. It is sometimes found in suburban parks and yards that have dense cover.

Behavior
This species' behavior is difficult to observe because it tends to keep hidden in dense cover. In the open it runs swiftly with its tail raised.

Feeding

The California thrasher forages mostly on the ground, by digging and sweeping leaf litter and soil with its bill. It walks or hops between foraging stops. Its diet in spring is almost exclusively insects and other small invertebrates, to which it adds small soft fruits during the rest of the year. When feeding on fruits it can be in exposed situations, but is often under cover.

Breeding

The California thrasher's core breeding season spans from February into July, though it often begins in January. It often raises two broods. Both sexes build the nest, an open cup of fine twigs and roots lined with finer material such as strips of bark and dried forbs, and placed on a platform of larger twigs. The clutch size is usually three to four. Both parents incubate the eggs and brood and feed the young. Common raven (Corvus corax) and California scrub jay (Aphelocoma californica) are common predators of eggs and nestlings.

Vocalization

The California thrasher is a "striking and exuberant songster". It mimics many of the species that share its habitat, and both sexes sing. It typically sings from elevated and exposed perches, "vigorous and 'cheerful' phrases variously repeated". It also has a wide variety of calls.

Status

The IUCN has assessed the California thrasher as being of Least Concern. It has a very large range, and very large population that has shown only a small decrease in recent decades. Habitat fragmentation and conversion appear to be the largest threats.

References

Further reading

Books

 Cody, M. L. 1998. California Thrasher (Toxostoma redivivum). In The Birds of North America, No. 323 (A. Poole and F. Gill, eds.). The Birds of North America, Inc., Philadelphia, PA.

Articles

 Academy Of Natural Sciences Of P. (1998). California Thrasher: Toxostoma redivivum. Birds of North America. vol 0, no 323. pp. 1–22.
 Burns KJ & Barhoum DN. (2006). Population-level history of the wrentit (Chamaea fasciata): Implications for comparative phylogeography in the California Floristic Province. Molecular Phylogenetics & Evolution. vol 38, no 1. pp. 117–129.
 Farnsworth A. (2001). WatchList species as viewed through the Christmas Bird Count database. American Birds. vol 102, pp. 29–31.
 Pearson OP. (1979). Spacing and Orientation among Feeding Golden-Crowned Sparrows Zonotrichia-Atricapilla. Condor. vol 81, no 3. pp. 278–285.
 Rich T & Rothstein SI. (1985). Sage Thrashers Oreoscoptes-Montanus Reject Cowbird Molothrus-Ater Eggs. Condor. vol 87, no 4. pp. 561–562.
 Sgariglia EA & Burns KJ. (2003). Phylogeography of the California Thrasher (Toxostoma redivivum) based on nested-clade analysis of mitochondrial-DNA variation. Auk. vol 120, no 2. pp. 346–361.
 Winter L. (2004). Trap-neuter-release programs: the reality and the impacts. Journal of the American Veterinary Medical Association. vol 225, no 9. pp. 1369–1376.
 Zink RM, Dittmann DL, Klicka J & Blackwell-Rago RC. (1999). Evolutionary patterns of morphometrics, allozymes, and mitochondrial DNA in thrashers (genus Toxostoma). Auk. vol 116, no 4. pp. 1021–1038.

External links

 
 
 California Thrasher - Toxostoma redivivum - USGS Patuxent Bird Identification InfoCenter
 
 California Thrasher Photo - "Birds of San Diego coastal scrub"
 

California thrasher
California thrasher
Endemic birds of Southwestern North America
Native birds of the West Coast of the United States
Birds of Mexico
Fauna of the California chaparral and woodlands
California thrasher
California thrasher
Least concern biota of North America